Huntington Creek is a tributary of the San Rafael River in northwestern Emery County, Utah, United States. It rises in the Electric Lake on the Wasatch Plateau in the Manti-La Sal National Forest, and flows down to the floor of Castle Valley in Emery County. Electric Lake, created in 1974, regulates its flow to supply water to the Huntington Power Plant at the bottom of the canyon. The creek is an important fishery.

See also

 List of rivers of Utah

References

External links

Rivers of Utah
Rivers of Emery County, Utah